The 2006–07 season in Swedish bandy, starting August 2006 and ending July 2007:

Honours

Official titles

Competitions

Promotions, relegations and qualifications

Promotions

Relegations

Domestic results

2006 Allsvenskan Norra 

Played between 8 November 2006 – 29 December 2006.

2006 Allsvenskan Södra 
Played between 10 November 2006 – 29 December 2006.

2007 Elitserien 
Played between 3 January 2007 – 18 February 2007.

2007 Superallsvenskan 
Played between 3 January 2007 – 18 February 2007.

2007 Allsvenskan Norra qualification play-off

2007 Allsvenskan Södra qualification play-off

2007 Elitserien play-off 
First round

Quarter-finals

Semi-finals

Final

National team results

Russian Government Cup 2006 
In the Russian Government Cup 2006, played in Irkutsk and Shelekhov, Sweden won the silver medals. The Russian club team Baykal-Energiya Irkutsk replaced Finland, as the Finns chose not to come to the tournament.

 8 December 2006:  – Baykal-Energiya 7–2
 9 December 2006:  –  13–2
 10 December 2006:  –  2–1

Bandy World Championship for men 2007 

In the Bandy World Championship 2007, Sweden played in Group A. Sweden played the following matches and won the silver medals.

Preliminary round
 28 January:  –  1–8
 29 January:  –  21–5
 30 January:  –  4–5
 31 January:  –  3–3
 2 February:  – Norway 20–7
Semifinal
 3 February:  –  2–3 (golden goal)
Final
 4 February:  –  3–1

Bandy World Championship for women 2007 

In the Bandy World Championship for women 2007, Sweden played the following matches and won the gold medals, becoming world champions for the third time.

Preliminary round
 12 February:  –  3–3 (Russia won penalty shoot out)
 13 February:  –  6–0
 13 February:  –  10–0
 14 February:  –  0–0 (Sweden won penalty shoot out)
 15 February:  –  9–0
 15 February:  –  7–1
Semifinal
 16 February:  –  7–0
Final
 17 February:  –  2–3

References 

Seasons in Swedish bandy
Bandy
Bandy
2006 in bandy
2007 in bandy